"Haze" is a song by American nu metal band Korn, written and recorded for the first-person shooter video game Haze.  It was released as a digital single on April 22, 2008. The game itself was released in May 2008 for the PlayStation 3. Korn posted a blog entry on April 23, 2008, stating that those who purchased their untitled album would be able to download "Haze" as a free VBR-quality MP3 by visiting a certain website. "Haze" was featured as a bonus track on the Enhanced Edition and the Australian re-release of their untitled album.

Live performance 
The song had its live premiere during the encore of the first European Avoid the Noid Pizza Party concert in Dublin on January 13, 2008, to a positive reception from the audience.

Music video 
The video is a live performance of "Haze" spliced with gameplay footage.  There is no word regarding whether or not the video will debut on television; so far it has only been released via YouTube and the PSN store at HD 1080p as a free download.

Mashup contest 
Ubisoft and Korn created a video mashup contest on April 28, 2008. The fans of Haze and the fans of Korn were given the opportunity to design the official video for "Haze". The winners were chosen on June 13, 2008, and the user "bootsrfun" on gametrailers.com was the first-place winner, which meant his entry was the official "Haze" video. There were also second-place, third-place, fourth-place and fifth-place winners.

References 

2008 singles
Korn songs
Song articles with missing songwriters
Video game theme songs